A List of A roads in Northern Ireland.

 
Roa
Northern Ireland
Nor